Guittone d'Arezzo (Arezzo,  1235 – 1294) was a Tuscan poet and the founder of the Tuscan School. He was an acclaimed secular love poet before his conversion in the 1260s, when he became a religious poet joining the Order of the Blessed Virgin Mary. In 1256, he was exiled from Arezzo due to his Guelf sympathies.

Biography 
Son of Viva di Michele and chamberlain of his area, he travelled often for business. He was a passionate supporter of the Guelfs, and had a wife and three children who he would later abandon in 1256 after a spiritual crisis. He joined the Order of the Blessed Virgin Mary,  a relatively exclusive group permitting members on the basis of financial background, showing Guittone's aristocratic familial origin and wealth. The group's primary goal was to favor and promote the peace between the Guelf and Ghibelline factions. 

Following his religious awakening, the tone and subject of Guittone's poems shifted. He started to sign his works as Fra Guittone, and in the canzone "Ora parrà s'eo saverò cantare" he refers to his previous love poems as foolish.

References 

1230s births
1294 deaths
Sonneteers
Italian poets
Italian male poets
Year of birth uncertain
13th-century Italian poets